Paul Hines Trulock III (May 20, 1943 – April 10, 2020) was an American politician. He served as a Democratic member for the 10th district of the Georgia State Senate.

Life and career 
Trulock was born in Thomasville, Georgia, the son of Margretta McGavock and Paul Trulock Jr. His father died in 1973. He was raised in Climax, Georgia. Trulock attended Bainbridge High School and the University of Georgia, earning his Bachelor of Science degree in agriculture in 1965.

Trulock bought ownership of Farmer's Peanut Company, whichbecame successful. In 1981, he was elected to represent the 10th district of the Georgia State Senate, defeating Henry P. Russell Jr. in the Democratic primary and succeeding him in the Senate In 1986, he was succeeded by Harold J. Ragan.

Trulock was a member of the First Presbyterian Church in Bainbridge, Georgia.

Trulock died in April 2020 at the Archbold Memorial Hospital, at the age of 76.

References 

1943 births
2020 deaths
People from Thomasville, Georgia
Democratic Party Georgia (U.S. state) state senators
20th-century American politicians
University of Georgia alumni